Wisconsin Dells is a city in Wisconsin, straddling four counties: Adams, Columbia, Juneau, and Sauk. A popular Midwestern tourist destination, the city forms an area known as "The Dells" with the nearby village of Lake Delton. The Dells is home to several water parks and tourist attractions. The city takes its name from the Dells of the Wisconsin River, a scenic, glacial-formed gorge that features sandstone formations along the banks of the Wisconsin River. The Columbia County portion of Wisconsin Dells is located in the Madison Metropolitan Statistical area, the Sauk County portion is a part of the Baraboo Micropolitan Statistical area, both of which are a part of the larger Madison CSA. 

Wisconsin Dells has a population of 2,942 people as of the 2020 census.

History

Wisconsin Dells is located on ancestral Ho-Chunk and Menominee land. According to Indian agent Joseph Montfort Street, the Sauk leader Black Hawk sought refuge with Ho-Chunks near the Dells of the Wisconsin River at the end of the Black Hawk War of 1832 before surrendering to the United States, but more recent research has argued that this was a mistranslation of the true location. The U.S. acquired the land in treaties with the Ho-Chunk nation in 1837 and with the Menominee in 1848, but Ho-Chunk people who resisted the U.S. policy of Indian removal continued to return to the area and eventually acquired small homesteads.

The city of Wisconsin Dells was founded in 1856 by the Wisconsin Hydraulic Company, a dam-building and real estate investment business. The town was originally named Kilbourn City for Byron Kilbourn, the president of the La Crosse & Milwaukee Railroad Company, which was then preparing to build a railroad across the Wisconsin River to connect Milwaukee and La Crosse, Wisconsin. The railroad's route caused great local controversy. Boosters and speculators had anticipated the river crossing two miles downriver, where they had established the town of Newport, Wisconsin, and attracted around 1,500 residents by 1855. When the railroad instead completed a slightly more northern route in 1857, Newport rapidly turned into a ghost town as its residents relocated to the site of the railroad bridge, bringing many buildings and even a church from the earlier town to reassemble in Kilbourn City.

In 1859, lumbermen destroyed the Wisconsin Hydraulic Company's new dam at Kilbourn City because it blocked the flow of timber rafts down the river. This led the company's main creditor, Byron Kilbourn, to foreclose on its property and take ownership of most of the city's real estate.

Tourism
Kilbourn City quickly became a popular travel destination in the Midwest due to the scenery of the Dells of the Wisconsin River and the ready railroad access. In 1856, entrepreneur Leroy Gates began taking tourists on boat tours of the Wisconsin Dells and promoting the town to railroad travelers. These tours were given using wooden rowboats until 1873 when two excursion steamers, the Modocawanda and the Dell Queen launched. Gates also established a photography studio in the city, which he sold to photographer H. H. Bennett in 1865. Over the following decades, Bennett took many photos of the sandstone formations in the dells, including stereoscopic views, as well as portraits of local Ho-Chunk people in Indian costume. Prints of Bennett's photographs were distributed across the United States and played a large role in promoting Kilbourn City as an exotic destination for sightseers. The H. H. Bennett Studio is now a historic site operated by the Wisconsin Historical Society.

In 1909, the Kilbourn Dam was completed across the Wisconsin River to generate hydroelectricity, over the protests of people such as H. H. Bennett, separating the Dells into the Upper and Lower Dells. It is now owned by Alliant Energy.

In 1928 Mr. Clinton Berry established Berry's Dells airport. It occupied sixty acres and was designated on government maps as beacon No. 19. Berry built the airport to carry visitors to the Dells from the surrounding metropolitan areas.

Kilbourn City shortened its name to Kilbourn in 1895 and then changed its name to Wisconsin Dells in 1931, identifying itself with the famous natural landscape of the Dells of the Wisconsin River.

In 1952, a new traveling performance from Chicago called "Tommy Bartlett's Thrill Show" came to Lake Delton on its second stop. Following the show's huge success in the city, its owner, Tommy Bartlett, chose to keep the performance permanently in Wisconsin Dells. To promote the show, Bartlett gave away bumper stickers advertising his thrill show and the city, effectively spreading word about the area across the nation. That tourist attraction closed permanently in 2020.

Soon more attractions followed to serve the ever-increasing tourists, along with many hotels, shops, and restaurants. Today, a large number of water parks are central to the local economy.

Lake Delton, Wisconsin Dells's sister city to the south, gradually became popular as the Dells attractions spread out. The Wonder Spot was founded in Lake Delton in 1952, and remained open until 2006.

Geography
According to the Wisconsin Department of Administration, on January 19, 2004 the city annexed land from the Town of Lyndon in Juneau County, thus expanding the city to include area in four counties. It is mostly located in Columbia County.

Climate 
Wisconsin Dells has a humid continental climate.

On July 13, 1936, the temperature in Wisconsin Dells reached , the highest ever recorded in the state of Wisconsin.

Demographics

Because it straddles multiple counties, Wisconsin Dells is part of several Core Based Statistical Areas (CBSAs). The Columbia County portion of the city is part of the Madison Metropolitan Statistical Area, while the Sauk County portion is part of the Baraboo Micropolitan Statistical Area. The Adams and Juneau county portions are not part of any metropolitan or micropolitan area.

2020 census
As of the census of 2020, the population was 2,942. The racial makeup of the city was 85.2% White, 2.9% Black or African American, 1.3% Native American, 0.4% Asian, 5.6% from other races, and 4.5% from two or more races. Ethnically, the population was 12.4% Hispanic or Latino of any race.

Of the 2020 total population of 2,942, the population by county was:

Adams County: 105
Columbia County: 2449
Juneau County: 4
Sauk County: 384

2010 census
As of the census of 2010, there were 2,678 people, 1,148 households, and 659 families residing in the city. The racial makeup of the city was 91.5% White, 0.7% African American, 1.8% Native American, 0.8% Asian, 0.1% Pacific Islander, 3.3% from other races, and 1.8% from two or more races. Hispanic or Latino of any race were 7.4% of the population.

There were 1,148 households, of which 27.4% had children under the age of 18 living with them, 40.9% were married couples living together, 10.3% had a female householder with no husband present, 6.3% had a male householder with no wife present, and 42.6% were non-families. 33.9% of all households were made up of individuals, and 12.8% had someone living alone who was 65 years of age or older. The average household size was 2.26 and the average family size was 2.87.

The median age in the city was 40.3 years. 20.6% of residents were under the age of 18; 9.5% were between the ages of 18 and 24; 25.4% were from 25 to 44; 26.6% were from 45 to 64; and 17.7% were 65 years of age or older. The gender makeup of the city was 49.6% male and 50.4% female.

Of the 2010 total population of 2,678, the population by county was:
Adams County: 61
Columbia County: 2,440
Juneau County: 2
Sauk County: 175

2000 census
As of the census of 2000, there were 2,418 people, 1,019 households, and 609 families residing in the city. The population density was 583.1 people per square mile (225.0/km2). There were 1,178 housing units at an average density of 284.1 per square mile (109.6/km2). The racial makeup of the city was 97.56% White, 0.37% African American, 0.87% Native American, 0.25% Asian, 0.33% from other races, and 0.62% from two or more races. Hispanic or Latino of any race were 1.70% of the population.

There were 1,019 households, out of which 26.7% had children under the age of 18 living with them, 45.5% were married couples living together, 10.2% had a female householder with no husband present, and 40.2% were non-families. 34.6% of all households were made up of individuals, and 15.4% had someone living alone who was 65 years of age or older. The average household size was 2.28 and the average family size was 2.93.

In the city, the population was spread out, with 22.0% under the age of 18, 7.8% from 18 to 24, 27.3% from 25 to 44, 23.6% from 45 to 64, and 19.3% who were 65 years of age or older. The median age was 41 years. For every 100 females, there were 87.9 males. For every 100 females age 18 and over, there were 86.7 males.

The median income for a household in the city was $35,699, and the median income for a family was $46,304. Males had a median income of $29,830 versus $22,553 for females. The per capita income for the city was $23,447. About 4.0% of families and 7.5% of the population were below the poverty line, including 9.7% of those under age 18 and 3.0% of those age 65 or over.

Economy

Tourism is the major contributor to the economy of Wisconsin Dells. The Dells area has many indoor and outdoor waterparks, proclaiming itself the "Waterpark Capital of the World". Other attractions include boat tours, zip-lining, golf courses, mini golf, go-kart tracks, water sports, horseback riding, a water ski show known as the Tommy Bartlett's Thrill Show (now closed), museums, amusement parks, and a casino. Most attractions are located on the Strip, otherwise known as the Wisconsin Dells Parkway. Accommodations range from economical motels to RV parks to chain hotels to themed resorts featuring indoor and outdoor waterparks and other amenities.

Amphibious DUKW vehicles called "ducks" began offering duck tours to tourists in Wisconsin Dells in 1946. The tours visit wilderness trails and enter nearby Lake Delton and the Wisconsin River. One company, Original Wisconsin Ducks, has more than 90 vehicles and is the largest operator of duck tours in the United States. Mayor Brian Landers stated, "Many of our own residents take duck rides. I've taken duck rides myself".

Since the late 1970s, the Dells area (Wisconsin Dells and Lake Delton) has become a water park mecca. Noah's Ark Waterpark opened in Lake Delton in 1979 and has become the largest and the eighth most visited water park in the U.S. Other outdoor amusement and water parks followed, featuring water slides, mini golf, roller coasters, go-karts, and other attractions.

The Polynesian Resort Hotel opened the United States' and the Dells area's first indoor waterpark in 1994. Since then, the number of combination resort/indoor waterparks in the Wisconsin Dells area has swelled, with each new indoor waterpark trying to have the latest innovations in waterslides and to be able to claim the title of America's largest park.

The Big 5 Dells resorts with large indoor waterparks are the Mt. Olympus Water & Theme Park, Wilderness Territory, Kalahari Resort, Chula Vista Resort, and Great Wolf Lodge. Other smaller hotels with waterparks include the Atlantis Resort.

In 2005, Big Chief Karts and Coasters merged with the former Family Land Waterpark and Treasure Island Hotel to create a large theme park on the border of Lake Delton and Wisconsin Dells, with a resort called Hotel Rome, an indoor waterpark, outdoor waterpark, theme park, and the area's first indoor theme park. The park, which has roller coasters, go-karts, and water slides, is called Mt. Olympus Water & Theme Park.

The Tanger Outlet Center opened in 2006 near the Great Wolf Lodge, replacing the defunct Wisconsin Dells Greyhound Park, which opened in May 1990, but closed in 1996 due to heavy competition from the nearby Ho-Chunk Gaming Wisconsin Dells Bingo/Casino. Since Mt. Olympus opened the Parthenon Indoor Theme Park in 2006, two more indoor theme parks were constructed in the area: Knuckleheads outside the Tanger Complex in 2007, and Kalahari Resort in December 2008. New attractions being constructed include more indoor waterpark resorts, the Grand Cambrian Resort, and the Wedge Resort.

Media
Wisconsin Dells is served by a local newspaper, Wisconsin Dells Events, and 2 local radio stations, WNNO and WDLS. The Wisconsin Dells Events is published by Capital Newspapers, which publishes multiple newspapers in south central Wisconsin. WNNO-FM broadcasts at 106.9 MHz and covers an area 20 miles in radius centered on Wisconsin Dells. WDLS broadcasts on 900 AM.

Infrastructure

Buildings
Kilbourn Public Library
Wawbeek-Horace A.J. Upham House
Jacob Weber House

Transportation

Bus
Greyhound Lines provides intrastate and interstate bus service to Wisconsin Dells on its Chicago - Milwaukee - Madison - Minneapolis route.

Rail
The Empire Builder, operated by Amtrak, provides daily rail service from the Wisconsin Dells Amtrak station. The station was built in the 1980s in the style of the original station. Freight railroad service is provided by the Canadian Pacific Railway under the Soo Line Railroad umbrella.

Utilities
Frontier Communications

Education
It is in the Wisconsin Dells School District, which operates Wisconsin Dells High School.

Notable people

Belle Boyd, Confederate spy
Lynn N. Coapman, Wisconsin state representative
Jack Flannery, CORR and SODA driver
Thomas Gillespie, Wisconsin state representative
Michael Griffin, U.S. representative
Alanson Holly, Wisconsin state representative and newspaper editor
Frank Kreyer, NASCAR driver
G. M. Marshall, Wisconsin state representative
Jack B. Olson, lieutenant governor of Wisconsin, businessman, and U.S. diplomat
James H. Quinn, Minnesota Supreme Court justice
Robert Schulz, jazz cornetist
Yellow Thunder, Ho-Chunk chief

Gallery

Sister city
Wisconsin Dells has one sister city.
  Iwaizumi-Cho (Japan) since 1990

See also
 National Register of Historic Places listings in Wisconsin

Notes

References

External links

Sanborn fire insurance maps: 1885 1892 1902 1909

 
Cities in Adams County, Wisconsin
Cities in Columbia County, Wisconsin
Cities in Juneau County, Wisconsin
Cities in Sauk County, Wisconsin
Cities in Wisconsin
Madison, Wisconsin, metropolitan statistical area
Populated places established in 1857
1857 establishments in Wisconsin